William Murray (10 June 1901 – 14 December 1961) was a football player and manager for Sunderland. He also played for Scottish League clubs Cowdenbeath and St Mirren.

Managerial career
Murray having formerly played for Sunderland for 10 seasons, was appointed manager of the club on 24 March 1939 and went on to lead the side for 18 seasons, a record at Sunderland. During his managerial time at Sunderland, he failed to win a trophy, whilst disrupted by World War II. He managed the Wearside club for 509 games and was eventually replaced by Alan Brown on 26 June 1957. Murray's resignation in June 1957 came amid an inquiry at Sunderland into illegal payments to players.

Honours

Player 
Sunderland

 Football League First Division (1): 1935–36
 Durham Senior Cup (3): 1928–29, 1931–32, 1934–35

Cowdenbeath

 Scottish League Second Division second-place promotion (1): 1923–24

Individual 

 Cowdenbeath Hall of Fame

References

External links 

 

1901 births
Scottish footballers
Sunderland A.F.C. managers
Sunderland A.F.C. players
Scottish football managers
Footballers from Aberdeen
English Football League players
Association football fullbacks
1961 deaths
Scottish Football League players
English Football League managers
Aberdeen F.C. players
Cowdenbeath F.C. players
St Mirren F.C. players